Valencisse is a commune in the Loir-et-Cher department of central France. The municipality was established on 1 January 2016 by merger of the former communes of Molineuf and Orchaise. On 1 January 2017, the former commune of Chambon-sur-Cisse was merged into Valencisse.

See also 
Communes of the Loir-et-Cher department

References 

Communes of Loir-et-Cher